The 1951 World Table Tennis Championships men's doubles was the 18th edition of the men's doubles championship.
Bohumil Váňa and Ivan Andreadis won the title after defeating József Kóczián and Ferenc Sidó in the final by three sets to nil.

Results

See also
List of World Table Tennis Championships medalists

References

-